In thermodynamics, the bubble point is the temperature (at a given  pressure) where the first bubble of vapor is formed when heating a liquid consisting of two or more components. Given that vapor will probably have a different composition than the liquid, the bubble point (along with the dew point) at different compositions are useful data when designing distillation systems.

For a single component the bubble point and the dew point are the same and are referred to as the boiling point.

Calculating the bubble point
At the bubble point, the following relationship holds:

where
.
K is the distribution coefficient or K factor, defined as the ratio of mole fraction in the vapor phase  to the mole fraction in the liquid phase  at equilibrium.

When Raoult's law and Dalton's law hold for the mixture, the K factor is defined as the ratio of the vapor pressure to the total pressure of the system:

References

See also
 Phase diagram
 Azeotrope
 Dew point

Temperature
Phase transitions
Gases